This article contains information about the literary events and publications of 1678.

Events
February – English dramatist Thomas Otway, perhaps escaping from an unhappy love affair with his leading actress, obtains a commission in an English regiment serving in the Franco-Dutch War and is sent in July to Flanders.
February 18 – The first part of English nonconformist John Bunyan's Christian allegory The Pilgrim's Progress, partly written while he was imprisoned for unlicensed preaching, is published in London.
March – The novel La Princesse de Clèves, presumed to be by Madame de La Fayette, is published in Paris. It is set in 1558–1559 and an early example of a psychological novel.
November – The English printer Joseph Moxon becomes the first tradesman to be elected a Fellow of the Royal Society of London.

New books

Prose
Manuel Ambrosio de Filguera – 
John Barret – The Christian Temper, or, A Discourse Concerning the Nature and Properties of the Graces of Sanctification
Jacob Boehme – ,  (Amsterdam & Frankfurt; contains a portrait of Boehme by N. van Werd)
John Bunyan – The Pilgrim's Progress
Ralph Cudworth – The True Intellectual System of the Universe
Madame de La Fayette (anonymously) – La Princesse de Clèves
Sir Thomas Herbert – Threnodia Carolina
Thomas Hobbes – Decameron Physiologicum
Josiah King – The Examination and Trial of Old Father Christmas Together with his Clearing by the Jury
The Mowing-Devil: or, Strange News out of Hartford-Shire (a woodcut showing what is alleged to be the first crop circle)
The Works of Geber, Englished by Richard Russell.
Thomas Rymer – The Tragedies of the Last Age Considered
Jacob Spon – Voyage d'Italie, de Dalmatie, de Grèce et du Levant
Aernout van Overbeke – De rym-wercken

Drama
Anonymous
Actio Curiosa
John Banks – The Destruction of Troy
Aphra Behn – Sir Patient Fancy
William Chamberlayne  – Wits Led by the Nose, or a Poet's Revenge published
Thomas Corneille – Le Comte d'Essex
John Dryden
All for Love
The Kind Keeper
Thomas d'Urfey
Trick for Trick
Squire Oldsapp
Edward Howard – The Man of Newmarket
 Nathaniel Lee – Mithridates, King of Pontus
John Leanerd
The Counterfeits
The Rambling Justice
Thomas Otway – Friendship in Fashion
Samuel Pordage – The Siege of Babylon
Edward Ravenscroft – The English Lawyer (adapted from George Ruggle's Latin play Ignoramus)
Thomas Rawlins – Tunbridge Wells
Titus Andronicus, or the Rape of Lavinia (adapted from Shakespeare's play)
Thomas Shadwell
The History of Timon of Athens the Man-Hater
A True Widow
Nahum Tate – Brutus of Alba

Poetry
Anne Bradstreet – Several Poems Compiled with Great Variety of Wit and Learning (posthumously published)
Samuel Butler – Hudibras, Part 3
Dorthe Engelbrechtsdatter –  ("The Souls Spiritual Offering of Song")

Births
January 10 – Paul Gabriel Antoine, French theologian (died 1743)
July – Thomas Hearne, editor of medieval manuscripts (died 1735)
December 14 – Daniel Neal, English historian (died 1743)
Unknown dates
Thomas Sherlock, English religious writer and bishop (died 1761)
William Wogan, Welsh religious writer in English (died 1758)

Deaths
January 16 – Madeleine de Souvré, marquise de Sablé, French writer and salonnière (born 1599)
March 10 – Jean de Launoy, French historian (born 1603)
April 12 – Sir Thomas Stanley, English poet, writer and translator (born 1625)
May 4 – Abraham Woodhead, English Catholic writer (born 1609)
May 14 or 15 – Anna Maria van Schurman, Dutch poet and scholar (born 1607)
August 16 – Andrew Marvell, English poet and politician (born 1621)
August 17 – Guillaume Herincx, Netherlandish theologian (born 1621)
November 21 – Robert Thoroton, English antiquary (born 1623)
Unknown date – Theophilus Gale, English theologian (born 1628)
Probable date – Richard Flecknoe English dramatist and poet (born c. 1600)

References

 
Years of the 17th century in literature